The Home Guard was a wartime armed service during World War II that was established with the primary objective of defending New Zealand from the threat posed by the Empire of Japan.

The Home Guard, modelled on its British equivalent, was formed in 1940. Membership was initially voluntary, with a minimum age of 15 but no upper limit. From 1942, membership was compulsory for those in the 35 to 50 age bracket.

One of the key responsibilities of the Home Guard was the mission of destroying any infrastructure, particularly bridges, that could be used by invading Japanese forces. In East Auckland, the Home Guard was predominantly made up of horse-mounted farmers who had been excused from war service. They carried out exercises in 1942 including one in which they tested the time taken to travel from Manukau Harbour to the Waitematā Harbour at Eastern Beach. Farmers with experience from World War I were used to construct beach obstacles such as barbed wire entanglements and to build concrete pillboxes. Eastern Beach had such pillboxes at each end. The long wave radio station at Musick Point was provided with bomb shelters from which emergency radios could be operated. A blackout was imposed and enforced by the Home Guard. The wooden wharf at Bucklands Beach, which was believed capable of aiding a Japanese landing, was demolished in 1942.

Members of the Home Guard who served for 28 days full-time or 6 months part-time were eligible for the New Zealand War Service Medal. At the peak of its membership, the Home Guard had approximately 119,000-123,000 men.

Further reading 
Nancy Taylor The Home Front 1986, Vol.1 pp. 450–480
Peter Cook, Defending New Zealand Ramparts on the Sea, Defence of New Zealand Study Group, August 2000,

References

Home front during World War II
Military units and formations of New Zealand
1940 establishments in New Zealand
1943 disestablishments in New Zealand